This is a list of members of the Victorian Legislative Assembly from 1929 to 1932, as elected at the 1929 state election.

Several realignments took place during the period:
 The Country Progressive Party re-merged with the Country Party in 1930. Harold Glowrey remained as an Independent.
 The Nationalist Party was renamed the United Australia Party (UAP) on 15 September 1931, to match the situation at federal level.
 During the 1932 election campaign, several Labor members including the Premier, Edmond Hogan, were expelled from the Victorian Labor Party for supporting the Premiers' Plan.

 In August 1930, the Nationalist member for Hawthorn, former Premier William Murray McPherson, resigned. Nationalist candidate John Austin Gray won the resulting by-election on 27 September 1930.
 In October 1930, the Liberal member for Caulfield, Frederick Forrest, died. Nationalist candidate and Lord Mayor of Melbourne, Harold Luxton, won the resulting by-election on 22 November 1930.

Sources
 Re-member (a database of all Victorian MPs since 1851). Parliament of Victoria.

References

Members of the Parliament of Victoria by term
20th-century Australian politicians